The Open Library of Humanities is a nonprofit, diamond open access publisher in the humanities and social sciences founded by Martin Paul Eve and Caroline Edwards. Founded in 2015, OLH publishes 27 scholarly journals as of 2022, including a mega journal, also called Open Library of Humanities, which was modeled on PLOS but not affiliated with it.

History
The Open Library of Humanities was officially launched on 28 September 2015. The project was funded by core grants from the Andrew W. Mellon Foundation and uses a library partnership subsidy model to cover costs. It has a number of advisory committees, such as the Academic Steering & Advocacy Committee which includes PLOS co-founder Michael Eisen, Quebec-based academic Jean-Claude Guédon, and the Director of Scholarly Communication of the Modern Language Association, Kathleen Fitzpatrick. An internationalization committee was formed in 2013 to develop an international strategy. A member of this committee, Francisco Osorio, has written that the open access model of the Open Library of Humanities may be beneficial for researchers publishing in languages other than English.

Although originally intended to run on Open Journal Systems, in 2017 OLH started development of a new platform, Janeway. Initially the main press site and the journal Orbit were hosted on the new platform. In of March 2022 the project to migrate the remaining jouranls was completed. The University of Lincoln, in partnership with  the Public Knowledge Project, offered a funded place for an MSc by Research in Computer Science to develop an open-source XML typesetting tool as proposed by the Open Library of Humanities technical roadmap. In November 2013 it was announced that the Public Knowledge Project will be funding the development of the typesetter, known as meTypeset.

The Open Library of Humanities publishing model relies on support from an international group of libraries, which enables the publication of articles without the need for article processing charges. In 2021, OLH became part of Birkbeck, University of London, maintaining its nonprofit status while reducing overhead.

Journals

Open Library of Humanities
19: Interdisciplinary Studies in the Long Nineteenth Century
ASIANetwork Exchange
Architectural Histories
Body, Space & Technology
C21 Literature: Journal of 21st-Century Writings
The Comics Grid: Journal of Comics Scholarship
Digital Medievalist
Digital Studies / Le champ numérique
Ethnologia Europaea
Francosphères
Genealogy+Critique
Glossa: a journal of general linguistics
International Journal of Welsh Writing in English
Journal of British and Irish Innovative Poetry
Journal of Embodied Research
Journal of Portuguese Linguistics
Laboratory Phonology
Marvell Studies
Open Screens
Orbit: A Journal of American Literature
Pynchon Notes
Quaker Studies
Studies in the Maternal
Theoretical Roman Archaeology Journal
Zeitschrift für Fantastikforschung
The Parish Review: Journal of Flann O'Brien Studies

References

External links

Non-profit academic publishers
Open access publishers
Andrew W. Mellon Foundation
Continuous journals
Charities based in the United Kingdom
2015 establishments in the United Kingdom